René Binder (born 1 January 1992) is an Austrian racing driver. He is the nephew of former Formula One driver Hans Binder, and his father, Franz, was also a racing driver.

Career 
Binder was born in Innsbruck. He began his racing career in karting in 2002, remaining in the category until 2008. During this time, he finished third in the German Junior Kart Championship in 2007 and was runner-up in the German Challenger Kart Championship in 2008. In 2009 he began his formula racing career by competing in the ADAC Formel Masters series for the Abt Sportsline team. Whilst his teammate Daniel Abt won the championship, Binder finished the season in seventh position with three podium finishes. Binder then moved up to the German Formula Three Championship: in 2010, he drove for Motopark Academy and finished in twelfth place in the championship, with a best result of third position; 2011 saw him move to the Jo Zeller Racing team, for whom he improved to eighth place despite missing a round of the championship; and for the 2012 season he is driving for the Van Amersfoort Racing team. In 2011 he also competed in one round of the FIA Formula Two Championship, held at the Austrian Red Bull Ring.

Binder made his GP2 Series début in the tenth round of the 2012 season, held at the Circuit de Spa-Francorchamps. He replaced Giancarlo Serenelli in the Lazarus team, where he partnered Sergio Canamasas. He did not score any championship points.

For the 2015 season, he will partner Ferrari Academy driver Raffaele Marciello at Trident Racing.

In 2018, he signed a contract with Juncos Racing to run the no. 32 car in 6 races of the 2018 IndyCar Series.

Racing record

Career summary

* Season still in progress.

Complete ADAC Formel Masters results
(key) (Races in bold indicate pole position) (Races in italics indicate fastest lap)

Complete FIA Formula Two Championship results
(key) (Races in bold indicate pole position) (Races in italics indicate fastest lap)

Complete GP2 Series results
(key) (Races in bold indicate pole position) (Races in italics indicate fastest lap)

Complete World Series Formula V8 3.5 results
(key) (Races in bold indicate pole position; races in italics indicate fastest lap)

Complete FIA Formula 2 Championship results
(key) (Races in bold indicate pole position) (Races in italics indicate points for the fastest lap of top ten finishers)

American open-wheel racing results
(key) (Races in bold indicate pole position) (Races in italics indicate fastest lap)

IndyCar Series
(key)

Complete FIA World Endurance Championship results

* Season still in progress.

Complete IMSA SportsCar Championship results
(key) (Races in bold indicate pole position; races in italics indicate fastest lap)

Complete European Le Mans Series results
(key) (Races in bold indicate pole position; results in italics indicate fastest lap)

Complete 24 Hours of Le Mans results

References

External links 
 Official website  
 René Binder career details at driverdb.com

1992 births
Living people
Sportspeople from Innsbruck
Austrian racing drivers
ADAC Formel Masters drivers
German Formula Three Championship drivers
FIA Formula Two Championship drivers
GP2 Series drivers
World Series Formula V8 3.5 drivers
FIA Formula 2 Championship drivers
IndyCar Series drivers
24 Hours of Daytona drivers
24 Hours of Le Mans drivers
European Le Mans Series drivers
FIA World Endurance Championship drivers
WeatherTech SportsCar Championship drivers
Motopark Academy drivers
Van Amersfoort Racing drivers
Team Lazarus drivers
Arden International drivers
Trident Racing drivers
MP Motorsport drivers
Charouz Racing System drivers
Carlin racing drivers
ART Grand Prix drivers
Juncos Hollinger Racing drivers
Kolles Racing drivers
Rapax Team drivers
G-Drive Racing drivers
Jo Zeller Racing drivers
Abt Sportsline drivers
Asian Le Mans Series drivers
Pons Racing drivers